The inferior rectus muscle is a muscle in the orbit near the eye. It is one of the four recti muscles in the group of extraocular muscles. It originates from the common tendinous ring, and inserts into the anteroinferior surface of the eye. It depresses the eye (downwards).

Structure
The inferior rectus muscle originates from the common tendinous ring (annulus of Zinn). It inserts into the anteroinferior surface of the eye. This insertion has a width of around 10.5 mm. It is around 7 mm from the corneal limbus.

Blood supply 
The inferior rectus muscle is supplied by an inferior muscular branch of the ophthalmic artery. It may also be supplied by a branch of the infraorbital artery. It is drained by the corresponding veins: the inferior muscular branch of the ophthalmic vein, and sometimes a branch of the infraorbital vein.

Nerve supply
The inferior rectus muscle is supplied by the inferior division of the oculomotor nerve (III).

Development 
The inferior rectus muscle develops from the embryonic mesoderm in the orbit of the skull. This is similar to the other extraocular muscles.

Relations 
The insertion of the inferior rectus muscle is around 6 mm from the insertion of the medial rectus muscle, and around 8 mm from the insertion of the lateral rectus muscle. A parasympathetic branch that supplies the ciliary muscles of the pupil passes close to the inferior rectus muscle.

Variation 
Very rarely, the inferior rectus muscle may be congenitally absent. This may cause inferior rectus palsy, where the eye cannot be depressed.

Function

The inferior rectus muscle depresses, adducts, and helps extort the eye. It is the only muscle that is capable of depressing the pupil when it is in a fully abducted position.

Clinical significance

Strabismus 
If the inferior rectus muscle is damaged, weak, or paralysed, this can cause strabismus. This can lead to elevation of the eye, as the superior rectus muscle remains stronger. For minor cases, prism glasses can be used to gradually realign the eye. Alternatively for serious cases, it may be surgically corrected by slightly weakening the superior rectus muscle (opposite) - this reduces the elevation of the eye, and corrects the strabismus. This procedure may lead to overcorrection of the strabismus, but is otherwise generally successful.

Surgery 
Any surgery on the inferior rectus muscle may damage the parasympathetic branches to the ciliary muscles of the pupil. This may cause problems with control of the pupil. Nearby blood vessels and nerves may also be damaged.

Additional images

References

External links
 
 
 Diagram at mun.ca

Muscles of the head and neck
Human eye anatomy

de:Augenmuskeln#Musculus rectus inferior